Slovenia participated in the ninth Winter Paralympics in Turin, Italy. 

Slovenia entered one athlete in the following sport:

Alpine skiing: 1 male

Medalists

See also
2006 Winter Paralympics
Slovenia at the 2006 Winter Olympics

External links
Torino 2006 Paralympic Games
International Paralympic Committee

2006
Nations at the 2006 Winter Paralympics
Winter Paralympics